Suvarna Mategaonkar (Marathi: सुवर्णा माटेगावकर) is an Indian singer.

Career
Mategaokar has performed in many stage programs of Marathi and Hindi film songs. She performs the program named Rang maza vegla with her daughter. She has made performances along with Hrishikesh Ranade, Jitendra Abhyankar, Ketaki Mategaonkar, Vibhavari Apte Joshi, Prashant Naseri etc.

Popular songs

Music albums

Awards
 Ram Kadam Award (2011)

Personal life
She is married to Parag Mategaonkar. Their daughter Ketaki Mategaonkar is also a singer and actor.

References

External links
 Suvarna Mategaonkar.

Living people
Musicians from Nagpur
Indian women playback singers
Singers from Maharashtra
Marathi-language singers
Women musicians from Maharashtra
Marathi playback singers
Bollywood playback singers
Year of birth missing (living people)